Marcoux Nunatak is a nunatak  high, about midway between the Schmidt Nunataks and Poorman Peak in the Wilson Hills of Antarctica. It stands above the ice near the head of Manna Glacier. The nunatak was mapped by the United States Geological Survey from surveys and U.S. Navy air photos, 1960–63, and was named by the Advisory Committee on Antarctic Names for John S. Marcoux, U.S. Navy, an aviation structural mechanic with Squadron VX-6, who wintered at McMurdo Station in 1967.

References

Nunataks of Oates Land